"Commitment Issues" is the debut single of the Danish sister duo Embrace, winners of the ninth season of the Danish version of X Factor. The English language song was their winners song in the finale of the show on 1 April 2016. The song peaked on the Hitlisten, the official Danish singles chart, at number 18.

Charts

References

 

Danish reality television series
2016 singles
2016 debut singles
2016 songs
Sony Music singles